Notre-Dame de l'Assomption is the name of several churches:

Notre-Dame de l'Assomption Abbey
Notre Dame de l'Assomption (Metz)
Notre-Dame de l'Assomption (Rouffach)
Notre Dame de l'Assomption, les Saintes
Notre-Dame-de-l'Assomption, Paris
Notre-Dame-de-l'Assomption, Port-au-Prince
Notre-Dame-de-l'Assomption, Moncton, New Brunswick Canada